Sundown is a small town in Hockley County, Texas, United States. The community school district is Sundown ISD. The population was 1,397 at the 2010 census, a decrease from 1,505 at the 2000 census.

Geography

Sundown is located at  (33.457018, –102.488283).

Demographics

2020 census

As of the 2020 United States census, there were 1,283 people, 488 households, and 378 families residing in the city.

2000 census
As of the census of 2000,  1,505 people, 500 households, and 405 families resided in the city. The population density was 995.0 people per square mile (384.8/km). The 575 housing units averaged 380.1 per square mile (147.0/km). The racial makeup of the city was 79.60% White, 1.00% African American, 0.53% Native American, 0.07% Asian, 16.81% from other races, and 1.99% from two or more races. Hispanics or Latinos of any race were 39.34% of the population.

Of the 500 households, 43.6% had children under the age of 18 living with them, 67.4% were married couples living together, 10.4% had a female householder with no husband present, and 18.8% were not families. About 18.2% of all households were made up of individuals, and 8.6% had someone living alone who was 65 years of age or older. The average household size was 3.00 and the average family size was 3.42.

In the city, the population was distributed as 34.0% under the age of 18, 8.3% from 18 to 24, 27.4% from 25 to 44, 18.8% from 45 to 64, and 11.5% who were 65 years of age or older. The median age was 32 years. For every 100 females, there were 92.2 males. For every 100 females age 18 and over, there were 95.5 males.

The median income for a household in the city was $33,413, and for a family was $35,991. Males had a median income of $30,714 versus $21,146 for females. The per capita income for the city was $13,783. About 14.3% of families and 16.5% of the population were below the poverty line, including 20.3% of those under age 18 and 10.8% of those age 65 or over.

References

Cities in Hockley County, Texas
Cities in Texas